A. crispa may refer to:

 Aerides crispa, an orchid
 Alder crispa, a tree in the birch family
 Alnus crispa, an alder with a wide range across the cooler parts of the Northern Hemisphere
 Amphiura crispa, a brittle star
 Anchusa crispa, a critically endangered species
 Ardisia crispa, a coralberry
 Astilbe crispa, a perennial, herbaceous flowering plant

See also
 Crispa (disambiguation)